Ooh may refer to:

Music
"Ooh!", 2003 single by Mary J. Blige
"Ooh", a song by BoDeans (1988)
"Ooh", a song by Brook Benton and the Sandmen (1955)
"Ooh", a song by La Lupe (1963)
"Ooh", a song by Roy Ayers	(1982)
"Ooh", a song by Scissor Sisters (2006)
"Oooh.", a 2000 song by De La Soul featuring Redman

Other uses
Occupational Outlook Handbook, a biennial publication of the U.S. Bureau of Labor Statistics
Out-of-home advertising
Out-of-hours service
oOh!media, an Australian advertising company

See also
 "Ooouuu", 2016 single by Young M.A
 Ooh La La (disambiguation)